The 1981–82 FIBA European Cup Winners' Cup was the sixteenth edition of FIBA's 2nd-tier level European-wide professional club basketball competition, contested between national domestic cup champions, running from 6 October 1981, to 16 March 1982. It was contested by 23 teams, three more than in the previous edition.

Cibona defeated Real Madrid, in the final held in Brussels, and won the FIBA European Cup Winners' Cup for the first time in its history.

Participants

First round

|}

*AEL withdrew before the first leg and Hapoel Ramat Gan received a forfeit (2-0) in both games.

Second round

|}

Automatically qualified to the Quarter finals group stage
 Sinudyne Bologna
 Cibona

Quarterfinals

Semifinals

|}

Final
March 16, Salle Henri Simonet, Brussels

|}

References

External links 
FIBA European Cup Winner's Cup 1981–82 linguasport.com
FIBA European Cup Winner's Cup 1981–82

FIBA
FIBA Saporta Cup